Kulbakul-e Kuchak (also Romanized as Kūlbākūl-e Kūchak; also known as Kūlbākūl and Kūl Bākūn) is a village in Rostam-e Do Rural District, in the Central District of Rostam County, Fars Province, Iran. At the 2006 census, its population was 139, in 26 families.

References 

Populated places in Rostam County